World Wonder Ring Stardom is a Japanese professional wrestling promotion founded in 2010. Stardom personnel consists of professional wrestlers, commentators, ring announcers, and various other positions. Executive officers are also listed. Stardom also frequently features wrestlers from promotions like Marvelous That's Women Pro Wrestling or Pro Wrestling Wave such as Takumi Iroha, Rin Kadokura and Maria. Many other wrestlers from various promotions from the Japanese independent scene are featured in events such as the rookie-based "New Blood".

Personnel

Wrestlers

Staff

Former alumni

Notable guests

Female

 Akane Fujita
 Alex Lee
 Alpha Female
 Aoi
 Arisa Nakajima
 Brandi Rhodes
 Cat Power
 Chelsea Green
 Cherry
 Christina Von Eerie
 Dark Angel / Sarita
 Dash Chisako
 Dump Matsumoto
 Emi Sakura
 Evie
 Faby Apache
 Goya Kong
 Hailey Hatred
 Haruka Umesaki
 Heidi Lovelace
 Hikaru Shida
 Hiragi Kurumi
 Hiroyo Matsumoto
 Jessicka Havok
 Kaoru / Infernal Kaoru
 Kellie Skater
 Kelly Klein
 Kyoko Kimura
 Leah Vaughan
 Leon
 Lin Byron
 Madison Eagles
 Makoto
 Manami Toyota
 Mandy Leon
 Mari Apache
 Maria
 Martina
 Meiko Satomura
 Mei Hoshizuki
 Mei Suruga
 Melina
 Melissa
 Mercedes Martinez
 Mia Yim
 Mio Shirai
 Mitsuo Momota
 Miyako Matsumoto
 Mochi Miyagi
 Momoka Hanazono
 Nikki Storm
 Portia Perez
 Ram Kaicho
 Rin Kadokura
 Risa Sera
 Rosa Negra / Scorpio Rosa
 Santana Garrett
 Sayaka Obihiro
 Sendai Sachiko
 Shayna
 She Nay Nay
 Star Fire
 Sumie Sakai
 Suzu Suzuki
 Taya
 Tessa Blanchard
 Thea Trinidad
 Thunder Rosa
 Tomoka Inaba
 Tomoka Nakagawa
 Tsubasa Kuragaki
 Tsukasa Fujimoto
 Tsukushi
 Viper
 Yuu Yamagata
 Zoe Lucas

Male

 Black Tiger
 Danshoku Dino
 Dr. Wagner Jr.
 Gabai-Ji-chan
 Genki Horiguchi H.A.Gee.Mee!!
 Gianni Valletta
 El Hijo de Dr. Wagner Jr.
 Hikaru Sato
 Hiroshi Yamato
 Kenny Omega
 Kinya Oyanagi
 Kota Ibushi
 Kuishinbo Kamen
 Masaaki Mochizuki
 Mil Máscaras
 Minoru Suzuki
 Minoru Tanaka
 Sasuke the Great
 Yoshihiro Takayama

Current stables 

Cosmic Angels
Donna Del Mondo
God's Eye
Neo Stardom Army
Oedo Tai
Prominence
Queen's Quest
Stars

Former stables 

 J.A.N.
 Kimura Monster-gun
 Kawasaki Katsushika Saikyou Densetsu
 Tokyo Cyber Squad

See also 

 List of professional wrestling rosters

References

External links

  
  (English)

World Wonder Ring Stardom
Lists of professional wrestling personnel